The Bağıştaş 1 Dam is a gravity dam on the Karasu River near İliç in Erzincan Province, eastern Turkey. The primary purpose of the dam is hydroelectric power generation and it supports a 48.6 MW power station. Construction began in 2010 and the generators were commissioned in 2012 and 2013. The dam and power plant are owned and operated by the State Hydraulic Works.

See also
Bağıştaş 1 Dam – upstream

References

Dams completed in 2014
Run-of-the-river power stations
Gravity dams
2014 establishments in Turkey
Energy infrastructure completed in 2014
Dams on the Karasu River
Dams in Erzincan Province
21st-century architecture in Turkey